Viviette is a 1918 American silent drama film directed by Walter Edwards, written by Julia Crawford Ivers and William J. Locke, and starring Vivian Martin, Eugene Pallette, Harrison Ford, Kate Toncray, Clara Whipple, and Donald Blakemore. It was released on June 9, 1918, by Paramount Pictures.

Plot
As described in a film magazine, Dick Ware (Pallette) is in love with Viviette (Martin), and the arrival of his handsome brother Austin (Ford) and Viviette's attentiveness to the visitor arouses the jealousy of Dick to such a degree that murder enters his heart. Austin, realizing the depth of Dick's feeling for the charming Viviette, asks Kathryn Holroyd (Whipple), a widowed friend of Viviette, to marry him. When Dick realizes that his brother is not trying to take Viviette away from him, he is both overjoyed and ashamed. The knowledge that Dick really loves her arouses a responsive chord in Viviette, and happiness reigns over the Ware household.

Cast
Vivian Martin as Viviette
Eugene Pallette as	Dick Ware
Harrison Ford as Austin Ware
Kate Toncray as Mrs. Ware
Clara Whipple as Kathryn Holroyd
Donald Blakemore as Lord Banstead

Reception
Like many American films of the time, Viviette was subject to restrictions and cuts by city and state film censorship boards. For example, the Chicago Board of Censors cut, in Reel 1, the two intertitles "Oh, listen, it's something you must know" and "What the devil do you expect me to do about it?", scene of young woman whispering in man's ear, and the entire incident of man taking wallet from pocket, removing bills, and offering them to young woman.

References

External links 

 

1918 films
1910s English-language films
Silent American drama films
1918 drama films
Paramount Pictures films
American black-and-white films
American silent feature films
Films based on British novels
Films directed by Walter Edwards
1910s American films